The NBL1 West Most Valuable Player (MVP) is an annual NBL1 West award given to the best performing player of the regular season. Known as the State Basketball League (SBL) MVP from 1989 to 2019, the SBL was rebranded to NBL1 West in 2021.

In 2022, the Women's MVP award was named in honour of Casey Mihovilovich after she broke the league's all-time games record.

Winners

Historical records

Past plaques

Pre-SBL
In the pre-SBL competition, a Fairest and Best player was awarded every year between 1975 and 1988.

References

Most Valuable Player
Basketball most valuable player awards
Awards established in 1975